Antoine Chessex (1980 in Vevey) is a Swiss artist and researcher who works with sound. Selected instrumental works include Les Abîmes Hallucinés (for Ensemble Proton in Bern), La Résonance des Ruines (for ICTUS Ensemble in Brussels), Plastic Concrete (For Apartment House in London), The Experience of Limit, and Echo/cide. 

Antoine Chessex is the recipient of a Swiss Music Prize from the Federal Office of Culture in 2020, as well as an Artist Prize "Werkjahr" from the City of Zurich in 2018.

Chessex is also a founding member of the noise band Monno with whom he toured extensively.
Collaborations with musicians Lasse Marhaug, Zbigniew Karkowski, Jérôme Noetinger, Maja Ratkje, Valerio Tricoli, Dave Phillips, architect Christian Waldvogel and media artist Ulrike Gabriel (Flow, 2002).

Discography 
chamber music:
Echo/cide & The Experience of Limit (Tochnit-Aleph, 2020)
Chessex, Noetinger & Apartment House (Bocian, 2016)
Furia played by Werktag (A Tree in A Field, 2015)
Selected Chamber Music Works (Tochnit-Aleph, 2014)
Dust for 3 violins, backtape and electronics (Cave12/Metamkine, 2011)

solo works:
Subjectivation (Rekem/Fragment Factory, 2018)
Multiple (Musica Moderna, 2014)
Errances (Under Platform, 2013)
Fools (Tourette, 2010)
Le Point Immobile (Mnoad, 2010)
Terra Incognita (Absurd, 2009)
Power, stupidity & ignorance (Petit mignon, 2009)
Untitled acoustic (Naivsuper, 2008)
Lost in destruction (Editions Zero, 2008)
Silences (Tanzprocesz, 2007)
No (Imvated, 2004)

with Monno:
Cheval Ouvert (2xLP, Staalplaat/Petit Mignon, 2015)
Cheval Ouvert (Idiosyncratics, 2013)
Ghosts (Conspiracy, 2009)
Error (Conspiracy, 2007)
Untitled (Soundimplant, 2004)
Candlelight technology (Subdeviant, 2003)

collaborations:
Coi Tormenti with Valerio Tricoli (Dilemma, 2010)
Calcination (Utech, 2009)
With Dave Phillips (Tochnit aleph compilation, 2005)
Swiftmachine (Creative sources, 2004)
Kainkwatett (Schraum, 2003)

External links 
 Antoine Chessex website

Swiss composers
Swiss male composers
Swiss saxophonists
Male saxophonists
Living people
1980 births
People from Vevey
21st-century saxophonists
21st-century male musicians